Ballophilus insperatus is a species of centipede in the genus Ballophilus. It is found in Madagascar. The original description of this species is based on specimens with 55 or 57 pairs of legs.

References 

Ballophilidae
Arthropods of Madagascar